So-Bahli-Alhi Glacier is in Snoqualmie National Forest in the U.S. state of Washington, on the north slopes of Whitehorse Mountain. Meaning lofty lady from the east in Native American language, So-Bahli-Alhi Glacier is along a climbing route to the summit of Whitehorse Mountain.

See also
List of glaciers in the United States

References

Cirques of the United States
Glaciers of Snohomish County, Washington